Narcissus viridiflorus, commonly known as campanitas, is a species of the genus Narcissus (daffodils) in the family Amaryllidaceae. It is classified in Section Jonquillae.

Description 
Narcissus viridiflorus possesses a number of unusual features for the genus Narcissus. It is the only species with green flowers, and is night flowering, and is one of only five species that bloom in the Autumn, rather than Spring.

Taxonomy
Danish botanist Peter Schousboe described the species in 1800 from material collected in Morocco. The species name is derived from the Latin words viridis "green" and flos/floris "flower".

Distribution 
Narcissus viridiflorus is native to the southern Iberian Peninsula (southern Spain) and North Africa (northern Morocco). It is known from fewer than 15 populations, with a total area of 84 square kilometres, and is threatened by overgrazing and urban development. It has not been well-studied in north Africa and there may be more populations there.

References 

viridiflorus
Garden plants
Flora of Spain